Adrienne Pearce (sometimes credited as Pierce or Pearse) is a South African actress, dancer, and voiceover artist. Her films include Proteus, The Bone Snatcher, Van der Merwe, Tremors: A Cold Day in Hell, and Glasshouse. On television, she has featured in the SABC series The Legend of the Hidden City and the Netflix series Troy: Fall of a City.

Early life
Pearce trained in dance at the Masque School of Ballet in Durban and the South African Dance Teachers' Association in Pretoria. She began her career performing audio programmes for Springbok Radio.

Filmography

Film

Television

Stage

Awards and nominations

References

External links

Living people
20th-century South African actresses
21st-century South African actresses
South African female dancers
South African stage actresses
South African voice actresses
Year of birth missing (living people)